Hamid El Mahdaoui (also written El Mahdaouy) is a Moroccan journalist, and activist. Since 2014, he is the founder and the editor-in-chief of the online news website Badil.info. On July 20, El Mahdaoui was arrested in Al Hoceima, and later sentenced to three years in prison and a fine of 20.000 Dirhams for his activism in Hirak Rif.

Biography 
Hamid El Mahdaoui was born on January 1, 1979, in the Moroccan town of Khnichet, northeast of Rabat. He lived in several cities to study and work. After working in several local newspapers, he decided to found his own news website, Badil.info, in 2014.

Trials and imprisonment 

Hamid El Mahdaoui was arrested and convicted to fines in several occasions.

In July 2017, he was sentenced to prison and a fine for "inciting for participation in a banned protest" and "breaking the law through speeches and shouting in public places" related to the movement of Hirak.

In the early morning of 20 July 2020, he was released after 3 years of imprisonment.

See also 
 Ali Anouzla
 Aboubakr Jamai

References

External links 
 Official Youtube channel
 Badil.info

Moroccan male journalists
Moroccan prisoners and detainees
Living people
Moroccan editors
1979 births
People from Kenitra